Neck of the Woods is a 2012 album by Silversun Pickups. 

Neck of the Woods may also refer to:

Neck of the Woods (Daniel Herskedal and Marius Neset album), 2012
"Neck of the Woods", a song by Birdman from the 2005 album Fast Money